The Calgary Inferno (previously known as Team Alberta, nickname "Honeybadgers", during the 2011–12 season) was a women's ice hockey team that joined the Canadian Women's Hockey League (CWHL) for the 2011–12 season. The team played its home games at Joan Snyder Rink (Arena B) at WinSport Canada in  Calgary, Alberta. After two seasons without an official name, in 2013 the team picked a moniker drawing from Calgary's National Hockey League franchise, the Calgary Flames, with whom they had a partnership. For the 2013-14 it was announced that all Inferno home-games will be streamed live by PCSN.tv.

In 2019, the CWHL ceased operations, as well as all teams that it directly operated including the Inferno.

History

The Canadian Women's Hockey League (CWHL) announced on April 19, 2011, that it would merge with the Western Women's Hockey League (WWHL) for the 2011–12 season. The merger featured one team based in Edmonton and Calgary as a combination of the former WWHL franchises the Edmonton Chimos and Strathmore Rockies. The team would play their games in various locations around Alberta. Strathmore Rockies founder, Samantha Holmes-Domagala, joined the sponsorship division of the CWHL to look after the requirements of the expansion team. On July 21, 2011, philanthropist Joan Snyder donated $2 million to WinSport Canada with the goal of ensuring priority rink access to female hockey players at all levels and help expand the CWHL with the creation of Team Alberta. Part of the donation covered the new addition to the Athletic and Ice Complex at Canada Olympic Park in Calgary and serve as the future home to Hockey Canada. It also included four hockey rinks, one of which was called the Joan Snyder Rink. Team Alberta would benefit with the allocation of free practice time, a dressing room exclusive to the club. The Joan Snyder Rink give priority to women's hockey bookings, but it also served as the Team Alberta's home rink.

The first general manager was Samantha Holmes, while the first head coach was Jason Schmidt. On July 21, 2011, the franchise participated in its first CWHL Draft. With the third overall pick in the 2011 CWHL Draft, Team Alberta selected Meaghan Mikkelson. With the first pick overall in the 2012 CWHL Draft, the team selected Hillary Pattenden. On October 28, 2011, Team Alberta played its first game in the CWHL versus the Burlington Barracudas. Laura Dostaler scored the first goal in Team Alberta history in a 4–2 victory. Other goals were scored by Meghan Hunter, Jenna Cunningham and Courtney Sawchuk.

On September 23, 2013, after two years without an official name, the team was announced as the Calgary Inferno at the Calgary Flames' arena, Scotiabank Saddledome, prior to a pre-season game between the Flames and the New York Rangers. On March 13, 2016, the Calgary Inferno defeated Les Canadiennes de Montreal in an 8–3 final to capture its first Clarkson Cup. Contested at Ottawa's Canadian Tire Centre, the first Clarkson Cup final held in an NHL arena, Blayre Turnbull, Brianne Jenner, Jessica Campbell and Rebecca Johnston each scored twice. Goaltender Delayne Brian was recognized as the Most Valuable Player of the Clarkson Cup playoffs.

On February 2, 2014, Danielle Stone broke two scoring records in Calgary Inferno franchise history. She began by topping Samantha Hunt's franchise record for most points in one season of 14 in a 2–1 shootout win against the Montreal Stars. In the same game, she set a new record for most points in one season by an Inferno rookie. In that same game, Jessica Wong logged a goal, providing her with seven points in the first five games of her CWHL career, a new franchise record for the Inferno.

At the 3rd CWHL All-Star Game in 2017, Jillian Saulnier and Jess Jones both scored a hat trick, becoming the first competitors in CWHL All-Star Game history to achieve the feat.

Season-by-season

Current roster
Updated August 8, 2018.

|}

Coaching staff

Kristen Hagg: general manager
Shannon Miller: head coach

Former staff
Bob Bedier, assistant coach
Tim Bothwell: head coach, 2012–14
Erin Duggan: assistant coach, 2011–12
Kevin Haller: head coach, 2014–15; assistant coach, 2012–14
Samantha Holmes-Domagala & Matt Appelt: general manager, 2011–12
Gina Kingsbury: assistant coach
Jason Schmidt: coach, 2011–12
Jeff Stevenson: general manager

Scoring leaders

Year-by-year

All-time

Awards and honours
Delayne Brian, 2014 CWHL Goaltender of the Year
Delayne Brian, 2016 Clarkson Cup Most Valuable Player 
Jessica Campbell, 2014–15 CWHL Leader, Game Winning Goals (5)
Rebecca Johnston, 2015 Angela James Bowl winner
Elana Lovell, 2016 CWHL Rookie of the Year

2011 draft picks
In preparation of its first season, the Team Alberta CWHL selected several players during a special draft of the league held on July 21, 2011, in Mississauga, Ontario.

Reference

References

External links
  Calgary Inferno

Ice hockey clubs established in 2011
Women's ice hockey teams in Canada
Ice hockey teams in Calgary
Canadian Women's Hockey League teams
2011 establishments in Alberta
Women in Alberta
2019 disestablishments in Alberta
Ice hockey clubs disestablished in 2019